Robert Alan Levine (born March 27, 1932) is an American anthropologist best known for his multidisciplinary and cross-cultural work on child development. He spent much of his academic career at Harvard University in the Graduate School of Education, where he has been emeritus professor since 1998.

Robert Levine grew up in New York. He completed his undergraduate studies at the University of Chicago in 1951 and then an M.A. in anthropology there in 1953. He then studied in the Department of Social Relations at Harvard, from which he received his PhD in Social Anthropology in 1958, based on fieldwork among the Gusii in East Africa. He taught at University of Chicago from 1960 to 1976. During that time, he also pursued research training in psychoanalysis at the Chicago Institute for Psychoanalysis. In 1976, he returned to Harvard where he was faculty in the Graduate School of Education until his formal retirement in 1998, though he continued to be active in research and mentoring for many years after his official retirement.

Levine's influence on psychological anthropology and the comparative study of childhood has been wide-ranging. Among other concepts, he is known for advancing a pluralistic view of ethnopsychologies, including critiquing contemporary psychological trait theory as ethnocentric. He has critiqued various prescriptive approaches to childrearing, arguing: "“We see parents as their children’s sponsors in a social world with multiple influences, setting priorities for the training of young children and selecting the environments that will shape their children’s development rather than influencing that development themselves,” 

Levine has been recognized in many ways for his contributions to social and psychological anthropology and to the understanding of child development. He was named to the U.S. National Academy of Education in 1979 and the American Academy of Arts and Sciences in 1989. In 1980, he was elected president of the Society for Psychological Anthropology, and in 1997 he received the SPA's Lifetime Achievement Award.

Interlocutors
Sudhir Kakar
Richard Shweder
Melford E. Spiro
Dinesh Sharma

References

Select publications
LeVine, R.A. (1971). The psychoanalytic study of lives in natural social settings. Human Development, 14, 100–109.
LeVine, R.A. (1973, 2nd Edition 1982). Culture, Behavior, and Personality: An Introduction to the Comparative Study of Psychosocial Adaptation. Chicago: Aldine. (Second Edition: New York: Aldine de Gruyter, 1982). (First Edition Spanish translation, 1977).
LeVine, R.A., ed. (1974). Culture and Personality: Contemporary Readings. Chicago: Aldine.
Shweder, R. & LeVine, R.A., eds. (1984). Culture Theory: Essays on Mind, Self and Emotion. Cambridge, U.K.: Cambridge University Press.
LeVine, R.A. (1984). Properties of culture: An ethnographic view. In R. Shweder & R.A. LeVine (eds.), Culture Theory: Essays on Mind, Emotion, and the Self. New York: Cambridge University Press.
LeVine, R.A., Miller, P. & West, M.M., eds. (1988). Parental Behavior in Diverse Societies. New Directions for Child Development Sourcebook No. 40. San Francisco: Jossey-Bass.
LeVine, R.A. (1990). Enculturation: A biosocial perspective on the development of self. In D. Cicchetti (ed.), The Development of the Self. Chicago: University of Chicago Press.
LeVine, R.A. (1990). Infant environments in psychoanalysis: A cross-cultural view. In R. Shweder, G. Herdt & J. Stigler (eds.), Cultural Psychology: and Human Development. New York: Cambridge University Press.
LeVine, R.A., Dixon, S., LeVine, S., Richman, A., Keefer, C., Leiderman, P.H. & Brazelton, T.B. (1994). Child Care and Culture: Lessons from Africa. New York: Cambridge University Press.
Shweder, R.A., Goodnow, J., Hatano, G., LeVine, R.A., Markus, H., and Miller, P. (1998). The cultural psychology of development: One mind, many mentalities. In R.M. Lerner (ed.), Vol. 1, Theoretical Models of Human Development, The Handbook of Child Psychology, 5th edition (edited by W. Damon). New York: Wiley
LeVine, R.A. (2002). Contexts and culture in psychological research. In J. Bempechat and J.G. Elliott (eds.), Learning in Culture and Context: Approaching the Complexities of Achievement Motivation in Student Learning. New Directions for Child and Adolescent Development, no. 96. Jossey-Bass Education Series. New York: John Wiley & Sons.
LeVine, R.A. (2003). Childhood Socialization: Comparative Studies of Parenting, Learning and Educational Change. CERC Monograph No. 20. Hong Kong: Comparative Education Research Centre, University of Hong Kong.
LeVine, R.A. and New, R.S., eds. (2008). Anthropology and Child Development: A Cross-Cultural Reader. Malden, MA: Blackwell Publishers. New York: Wiley-Blackwell.
LeVine, R.A. (2007) Ethnographic studies of childhood: A historical overview. American Anthropologist 109: 247–260.
LeVine, R.A., ed., (2010). Psychological Anthropology: A Reader on Self in Culture. Malden, MA: Wiley-Blackwell.
Levine, R. A., and Levine, S. (2017) Do Parents Matter? Why Japanese Babies Sleep Soundly, Mexican Siblings Dont Fight, and American Families Should Just Relax. New York, NY: PublicAffairs.

External links
CV 
Gaines, A.D. Culture, Development and Self: The Work of Robert A. LeVine. Cult Med Psychiatry 39, 584–596 (2015). https://doi.org/10.1007/s11013-015-9482-3
Sharma, D. (2021). The Cultural Psyche: The Selected Papers of Robert A. LeVine on Psychosocial Science. North Carolina: Information Age Press.

1932 births
Psychological anthropologists
Psychological anthropology
Harvard Graduate School of Arts and Sciences alumni
University of Chicago alumni
Living people